The Joneses Have Amateur Theatricals is a 1909 silent short comedy film directed by D. W. Griffith. It was released in split-reel form with The Hindoo Dagger.

Cast
John R. Cumpson - Mr. Jones
Florence Lawrence - Mrs. Jones
Linda Arvidson - The Maid
Clara T. Bracy -
George Gebhardt - Theatre Man
Anita Hendrie - Theatre Woman
Marion Leonard - Mrs. Trouble
David Miles - Theatre Man
Herbert Prior - Theatre Man
Mack Sennett - Theatre Man
Harry Solter -
Dorothy West - Theatre Man

References

External links
The Joneses Have Amateur Theatricals at IMDb.com
The Joneses Have Amateur Theatricals available for free download at Internet Archive

1909 films
1909 comedy films
Silent American comedy films
American silent short films
Biograph Company films
Films directed by D. W. Griffith
American black-and-white films
1909 short films
American comedy short films
1900s American films